Danny Yeo (born 1 June 1990) is a Singaporean swimmer.

Career
Yeo currently holds the national record in the Long Course (50m) for the 4 × 100 m freestyle relay together with Joseph Schooling, Quah Zheng Wen and Pang Sheng Jun and the 4 × 200 m freestyle relay with Joseph, Quah and Darren Lim.

In the Short Course (25m), he currently holds the national record for the 4×50m freestyle relay together with Dylan Koo, Pang Sheng Jun and Lionel Khoo.

He competes in the 50, 100 and 200 metres freestyle.

Personal life
Yeo's father died when Yeo was 16 but persevered on to become who he is today. He had a thought of retiring in 2015 when he suffered numerous injuries and sickness.

References

1990 births
Living people
Singaporean male freestyle swimmers
Male medley swimmers
Singaporean sportspeople of Chinese descent
Swimmers at the 2010 Asian Games
Swimmers at the 2014 Asian Games
Swimmers at the 2018 Asian Games
Asian Games bronze medalists for Singapore
Asian Games medalists in swimming
Medalists at the 2014 Asian Games
Medalists at the 2018 Asian Games
Southeast Asian Games medalists in swimming
Southeast Asian Games gold medalists for Singapore
Southeast Asian Games silver medalists for Singapore
Southeast Asian Games bronze medalists for Singapore
Competitors at the 2009 Southeast Asian Games
Competitors at the 2011 Southeast Asian Games
Competitors at the 2013 Southeast Asian Games
Competitors at the 2015 Southeast Asian Games
Competitors at the 2017 Southeast Asian Games
21st-century Singaporean people